The 1892 college football season was the season of American football played among colleges and universities in the United States during the 1892–93 academic year. 

The 1892 Yale Bulldogs football team, led by head coach Walter Camp, compiled a perfect 13–0 record, outscored opponents by a total of 429 to 0, and has been recognized as the national champion by the Billingsley Report, Helms Athletic Foundation, Houlgate System, National Championship Foundation, and Parke H. Davis. Yale's 1892 season was part of a 37-game winning streak that began at the end of the 1890 season and continued into the 1893 season.

All eleven players selected by Caspar Whitney and Walter Camp to the 1892 All-America college football team came from the Big Three (Yale, Harvard, and Princeton). The selections included center William H. Lewis, the first African-American All-American. Five of the honorees have been inducted into the College Football Hall of Fame: quarterback Philip King, fullback Charley Brewer (Harvard), end Frank Hinkey (Yale), tackle Marshall Newell (Harvard), and guard Art Wheeler (Princeton).

Several colleges and universities in the Deep South established football programs in 1892, including Alabama, Auburn, Georgia, Georgia Tech, and South Carolina. In the first college football game in the region, Georgia defeated Mercer on January 30, 1892. 

On September 28, 1892, the first football game played outdoors at night took place, between Wyoming Seminary and Mansfield State Normal. The lighting proved difficult and the game ended at halftime in a scoreless tie.

Conference and program changes

Conference establishments
The Western Interstate University Football Association began its first season of play

Membership changes

Conference standings
The following is a potentially incomplete list of conference standings:

Independents

Awards and honors

All-Americans

The consensus All-America team included:

Statistical leaders
Player scoring most points: Philip King, Princeton, 105

See also
1892 Wyoming Seminary vs. Mansfield State Normal football game

References